Nokia's strategic nomenclature can be traced back in 2005 when the Nseries line was launched, offering devices with flagship specifications and premium hardware at various price points. These devices were considered the "bread and butter" of the company and were often positioned to showcase their latest technologies. Thanks to the newfound consumer and enterprise interest in smartphones at the time, the company introduced four additional collections to diversify their product portfolio and meet demands in most market segments. These new phone series were named Eseries, targeting small business and enterprise customers; Xseries, providing consumer-grade multimedia-focused devices; Cseries, which Nokia used to target both the low-end and mid-range market segments; and Tseries, for devices exclusive to the Chinese market.

Nokia Nseries

Nokia Nseries was a multimedia smartphone and tablet product family that served as the company's flagship portfolio. It was aimed at users looking to pack as many features as possible into one device.

Nokia N70 is one of the first products successfully launched from the series. It has introduced a sliding camera cover on its rear view, protecting the lens and triggers the camera feature when opened, which was later used in other phones created by Nokia. High resolution 2-megapixel camera with video capture, Bluetooth, FM radio, RealPlayer media viewing and support for WAP 2.0 are also the notable features offered by this device.
Nokia N71 is a phone in clamshell form factor, mostly recommended for consumers who search for enhanced ergonomics due to its button arrangement. It supports SMS, MMS, voice and video calling, Internet browsing, Bluetooth wireless technology, among many other features. Like the Nokia N70, it has a 2-megapixel camera. To connect with PC, it uses the proprietary Pop-Port medium.
Nokia N72 is a stylish Nseries device that comes in two designs: gloss black and pearl pink. It only runs through the GSM network, and has no front-facing camera. The device takes from Nokia N70's design cues.
Nokia N73 is one of the range's best-selling smartphones. Apart from the more compact design, it also has improved its camera compared to the Nokia N72, packing 3.2-megapixels with Carl Zeiss lens. It is capable of video calling, and was the first device to be termed the "multimedia computer." The camera is praised for taking sharp, clear and crisp photos.
Nokia N91 was the first ever phone encompassing a 4 GB internal hard drive, allowing storage for 3,000 songs (an 8 GB revision came later). The N91 is highly focused on music, with dedicated music keys on the front which slide down to reveal the keypad. It also featured the industry-standard 3.5 mm headphone jack.
Nokia N95 is a smartphone announced in September 2006 and released to the market in March 2007. The N95 ran S60 3rd Edition, on Symbian OS v9.2. It has a two-way sliding mechanism, which can be used to access either media playback buttons or a numeric keypad. The N95 was a high-end model that was marketed as a "multimedia computer", much like other Nseries devices.[1] It featured a then-high 5 megapixel resolution digital camera with Carl Zeiss optics and with a flash, as well as a then-large display measuring 2.6 inches. It was also Nokia's first device with a built-in Global Positioning System (GPS) receiver, used for maps or turn-by-turn navigation, and their first with an accelerometer. It was also one of the earliest devices in the market supporting HSDPA (3.5G) signals.

List of Eseries devices 

The Nokia Eseries (stands for Executive) consists of business-oriented smartphones, with emphasis on enhanced connectivity and support for corporate e-mail push services. These phones are for the enterprise market.

The list may also include upcoming devices or others that are previously intended to be a part of the series, but was scrapped or renamed due to Nokia's number-only naming change. These are the phones included in the series:
Nokia E50 is a phone intended primarily for the corporate business market. It includes sophisticated e-mail support for Intellisync, BlackBerry Connect, Visto Mobile and ActiveSync Mail for Exchange.
Nokia E51 is one of the leaner enterprise devices from the Finnish phone-maker. One of the main highlights of the phone is the multiple one-touch dedicated buttons for email, contacts and calendar applications. These keys are also customizable, recognizing short and long presses.
Nokia E52 is an Eseries device with a longer battery life, for consumers looking for an enterprise phone that is well-built and does not drain quickly. The phone can also serve as a data modem through the use of Bluetooth wireless technology.
Nokia E55 is a mobile phone for business use, intended to be compact, yet suitable for writing e-mails and other longer texts. This is done via a so-called compact QWERTY keyboard with two characters per key. Designwise, the Nokia E55 is almost exactly identical to its twin, the Nokia E52, and both phones feature exactly the same specifications. The only difference lies in their keypad layout.
Nokia E60 is a traditional candybar style smartphone from the Eseries business phone range, a S60 3rd Edition device. The phone had SIP (VoIP) and Wi-Fi support and a unique high resolution display. E60 distinctly had no camera. This is one of the first Eseries devices to be announced.
Nokia E61 is a QWERTY business device initially for the European market, but then later released worldwide. It follows the form factor of RIM's BlackBerry devices and offers many work-related features.
Nokia E61i is a follow-up to the Nokia E61 featuring a 2-megapixel camera and D-pad instead of a joystick.
Nokia E62 has a screen, a QWERTY keyboard, and wireless options (Bluetooth, UMTS). The Symbian smartphone also has a speakerphone, the ability to view and edit Microsoft Office documents, and e-mail capabilities.
Nokia E63 offers a more wallet-friendly price tag compared with other unlocked smartphones and does so without sacrificing too many features. It offers a full QWERTY keyboard and full e-mail capabilities. The Symbian smartphone has integrated Wi-Fi, Bluetooth, and 3G support.
Nokia E65 has a beautiful and compact slider design, and features a 2-megapixel camera, e-mail, and productivity apps. It also offers good call quality and solid talk time battery life, and has Bluetooth and Wi-Fi.
Nokia E66 includes an accelerometer which brings animations and transition effects. It is a complete redesign of the Nokia E65.
Nokia E70 is a candybar/fold keyboard type smartphone from the Eseries range, announced in October 2005 and released in May 2006 at a cost of approximately $500 with prices in July 2007 around $345.
Nokia E71 is one of the best-selling Eseries devices to date. It features optimized mobile email and messaging experience with full QWERTY keyboard and pocket-size for one-handed typing, two customizable homescreen views with active stand-by plug-ins and application shortcuts – fast and easy switching between Business and Personal modes, quick access to applications with one-touch keys (Home, Calendar, Contacts, Messaging), intelligent input with auto-completion, auto-correction and learning capabilities ensuring fast and error-free typing and a lot more. The phone won several accolades from respected technology blogs and events including CNET, Mobile Choice Consumer Awards, Wired Magazine and GSMA Awards 2009.
Nokia E71x is the thinnest smartphone available on AT&T before the arrival of Apple's iPhone 4. The phone is affordably priced and offers a long list of features, including 3G, Wi-Fi, Bluetooth, GPS, and a 3.2-megapixel camera, as well as support for AT&T's various services. The QWERTY smartphone is very sleek with high-quality construction, clad in "metal black" color.
Nokia E72 with free GPS navigation is a high-performance device tailor-made for seamless business and personal communication. It takes cues from its predecessor, the Nokia E71 and has an improved look of the user interface.
Nokia E72i is a China-only handset made specifically to cater services offered in that region. It also replaced WLAN with WAPI, as it is the standard wireless network available in that country. Most of the features found on the original Nokia E72 were retained.
Nokia E73 is a T-Mobile exclusive offering from Nokia. The pre-installed Ovi Maps provides free turn-by-turn navigation. It combines the features of Nokia E71 and Nokia E72, to appeal to the North American market.
Nokia E73 Mode  is a feature phone being a  successor to the Nokia E73 including standard features like mobile email, calendar and instant messaging among many others with 2G and 3G network services.
Nokia E75 ships with Nokia's new messaging client, which features push delivery for all accounts. Other highlights include 3G, Wi-Fi, Bluetooth, and a 3.2-megapixel camera. On front, you will find a 2.4-inch, 16 million-color QVGA display. It's a good size screen considering the smaller chassis, and it's quite sharp and vibrant. In addition, it features a light sensing technology that adjusts the display's brightness depending on what environment you are in. As always, you can customize the homescreen with various themes, wallpaper, and change the font size. Also, like the Nokia E71, you can switch between two different home views depending on whether you are at work or play. In Business mode, the phone gives you immediate access to your e-mail and productivity apps, while switching to the Personal view will bring recreational features, like the media player, N-Gage games, to the forefront.
Nokia E90 is equipped with Bluetooth, Wi-Fi, and GPS, and has a solid set of productivity and communication features for the business user. The Symbian smartphone also has a full QWERTY keyboard and 3.2-megapixel camera. The Nokia E90 does not support U.S. 3G networks, and speakerphone volume is a bit weak. The handset is also heavy and bulky.
Nokia E5 features IM (instant messenger) that allows access to several chat services or communities simultaneously.
Nokia E6 is one of the first two smartphones to be released with the Symbian Anna software update. It includes 50+ enhancements to the operating system, and a new set of icons. 
Nokia E7

List of Xseries devices 

Nokia Xseries (stands for Xpress) is more for younger users. Most of the phones included in the line are feature phones and smartphones that include features focusing social entertainment and music with special dedicated keys, inbuilt storage and other facilities. It succeeded the Nokia XpressMusic brand of phones.

The list may also include upcoming devices or others that are previously intended to be a part of the series, but was scrapped or renamed due to Nokia's number-only naming change. These are the phones included in the series:
Nokia X1 is a basic cellular phone with focus on music and entertainment, running on Nokia's proprietary Series 30 platform. The phone offers up to five separate phonebooks, a flashlight and one of the first S30 devices to have a dedicated music player.
Nokia X1-01 is a dual-SIM offering from Nokia that aims to connect "the next billion." The device features a dual-standby interface, that allows the user to use both SIMs on the phone at the same time. The phone also has dedicated music player, and a speaker on the back which can deliver up to 106 phon.
Nokia X2 packs dual speakers, dedicated music keys, FM stereo and support for up to 16 GB of storage via microSD card make for a nifty mobile music device. Bluetooth 2.1 is supported for wireless music enjoyment whilst hardcore music fans can opt for the 3.5mm headphone jack. Full speed USB 2.0 makes music transfer quick and easy and music can be managed via the Ovi Player PC client or Windows Media Player 11. There was two models namely X2-00, X2-02.
Nokia X2-01 offers one-click access to music, the media player, FM radio and the Ovi Music service, for unlimited access to a vast library of tunes. It is a cheap QWERTY featurephone running on Series 40 operating system.
Nokia X2-03 is the Chinese release of the Nokia X2-01, featuring improvements in its keypad and support for Chinese characters like Pinyin and Mandarin.
Nokia X2-05 comes with a 106-phon speaker, enabling superb audio volume and quality. It can also play MP3 and MP4 files, FM radio with recording capabilities and a VGA camera.
Nokia X3 is the first Series 40 device to be compatible with the Ovi Store. It is a phone in a sliding form factor that offers great music quality, a 3.2-megapixel camera, a diminutive frame and 2.2-inch screen.
Nokia X3-01 is a Chinese specific release, which supports the country's CDMA/EV-DO wireless technology. The phone has a 2.4-inch QVGA-display, FM radio, 3.5mm headset jack, 3.2-megapixel camera with LED flash and support for a number of specific services in China.
Nokia X3-02 offers both a touch screen and a traditional 12-button keypad. It is also the world's first mobile phone to run the Series 40 6th Edition operating system, optimized for slate devices. It is one of Nokia's thinnest devices: it is 9.6mm deep, 106mm tall, 48mm wide and weighs just 78g. The brushed aluminium finish and choice of five colors are also likely to appeal to fashion-conscious mobilists.
Nokia X5 is a smartphone running Symbian S60, released in China only, under China Mobile. It makes use of the TD-SCDMA network.
Nokia X5-01 features excellent sound quality, dedicated music keys and loud speakers, and will include access to Ovi Music, and to Comes with Music in some regions. There is a full QWERTY keyboard under the dashboard, ready to deliver Tweets, status updates and text messages at your convenience. The device supports all the major IM and webmail services out of the box and also offers easy access to major social networking sites (Facebook, Twitter, Myspace and Hi5). The camera offers 5 megapixels, 4x digital zoom and an LED flash.
Nokia X6 features about 16 days standby time, a 5-megapixel camera and Carl Zeiss optics, dual LED flash, TV-out, video editing, online sharing, Nokia Music Store, full Web browser, A-GPS, Ovi Maps, Playlist DJ and Flash Lite support.
Nokia X7 offers a unique and durable design that will stand out from the crowd, due to it being made from toughened glass and seamless stainless steel. The 4-inch, capacitive AMOLED display offers 16 million colors and a resolution of 640 x 360 pixels. It is also one of the first phones to have Symbian Anna.
Nokia X500 is a Symbian smartphone carrying a 1 GHz processor and the Anna version of the operating system. The phone has colorful exchangeable covers and a 5-megapixel camera. Split-screen messaging, Internet radio, support for a variety of languages and better battery performance were also added to the device.
Nokia X600 is the first smartphone from Nokia to feature a 106 phon, fully functional speaker. The phone features a curved back design available in colors green, pink, white and black, mostly seen from their earlier music devices; it allows better ergonomics and one-hand typing. The Nokia X600 comes with a pentaband radio, and supports 3G data rates up to HSUPA standards, as well as Wi-Fi and Bluetooth. After careful consideration, the phone was cancelled a day before its release, possibly because of the production of the Nokia Windows Phones.

List of Cseries devices 

Nokia Cseries (stands for Core) is what Nokia calls their "core" range of products, offering different phones from low-end to high-end for various markets.

The list may also include upcoming devices or others that are previously intended to be a part of the series, but was scrapped or renamed due to Nokia's number-only naming change. These are the phones included in the series:
Nokia C1-00 has space for two SIM cards and allows the owner to switch between them easily. It also includes a powerful, long-lasting battery, FM radio and torch. It is identical with the Nokia 1616, with the only difference being that the Nokia 1616 is a single SIM phone.
Nokia C1-01 offers e-mail, instant messaging services, the Internet and Nokia's Ovi Life Tools.
Nokia C1-02 has a music player with support for up to 32 GB of expandable memory.
Nokia C1-03 is a Chinese-specific release combining all the features of Nokia C1-01 with deep integration of traditional Chinese characters and Pinyin.
Nokia C2 is a dual-SIM variant of the Nokia C1-01, offering the same feature set with the addition of Easy Swap.
Nokia C2-01 gives the user the freedom to get the latest news, check e-mails and keep up with social networks with a 3G connection.
Nokia C2-02 is a Touch and Type offering from Nokia, with a single SIM card slot and a sliding form factor. The phone includes a re-hashed Nokia Browser (formerly Ovi Browser) and an offline-available Series 40 version of Nokia Maps.
Nokia C2-03 is a dual-SIM variant of the Nokia C2-02, offering the same feature set with the addition of Easy Swap.
Nokia C2-05 comes with the new Nokia Browser and Nokia Store, enabling seamless integration of online activities. The phone runs on Series 40, and comes with a VGA camera with digital zoom and full-screen viewfinder.
Nokia C2-06 is a dual-SIM phone with a 2.6” touch screen and a slide-out keypad. The phone also uses the swiping feature similar to that of Nokia N9.
Nokia C3 has Wi-Fi, and social network features.
Nokia C3-01 lets you flip through photos or browse Web pages on the touch screen and type using the keypad. Supports social networking, e-mail and chat services. The phone has a compact design, and stainless steel casing.
 Nokia C310i
Nokia C5 (5 MP) come with a 3.2-megapixel camera (5-megapixel, respectively). The Nokia C5 5 MP (also C5-00.2) is the latest release of the Nokia C5-00 smartphone, offering the same feature set and appearance as its original version, but with more RAM and higher camera resolution.
Nokia C5-01 is a phone for TD-SCDMA. It runs S60 3rd Edition Feature Pack 2 on Symbian OS 9.3 and features a 5-megapixel camera and stainless steel materials. It supports for a number of services including 139 Mailbox, Fetion IM, MM-Ovi Store and a range of pre-loaded content.
Nokia C5-02 is China Telecom's offering with 2.6-inch QVGA resolution 260,000 color TFT screen.
Nokia C5-03 is one of the last few releases of Nokia under the Symbian^1 operating system as they move to Symbian^3, Symbian Anna and further releases. It is also a budget resistive touchscreen smartphone with Wi-Fi from the Cseries that was released in December 2010. The phone has Shazam music identification software and social networking services included or available for download.
Nokia C5-04 is a Wind Mobile specific device featuring resistive touchscreen running on Symbian^1 operating system with HD voice. It also features a 2-megapixel camera.
Nokia C5-05 is a downgraded variant of the Nokia C5-03, more for younger users. The features were retained, except for the camera which is downgraded to 2 megapixels, similar to the Canadian version.
Nokia C5-06 is a device similar to the Nokia C5-03, but lacks WLAN connectivity.
Nokia C5-08 is another variant of Nokia C5-03, subsidized to European networks.
Nokia C6 is a device with a similar form factor to Nokia N900 and Nokia N810. With a 3.2-inch HD touchscreen display and a slide out four-row QWERTY keyboard. Also with 5-megapixel camera.
Nokia C6-01 is a fully functional communicator with support for 3G and Wi-Fi on board. It also has a 3.2-inch AMOLED capacative touch-screen ClearBlack display. The Nokia C6-01 is also one of Nokia's greenest devices to date, featuring the use of bioplastics and recycled metals for much of its construction.
Nokia C7 offers a full-touch glass display with social network integration, thousands of app offerings from the Ovi Store, customizable homescreens and 8-megapixel camera with HD video recording.
Nokia C7 Astound is T-Mobile USA's version of Nokia C7 offering the same features, with the sudden addition of Wi-Fi calling.
Nokia C7 Oro is a Nokia C7 made entirely of three luxurious and precious materials—sapphire crystal, leather and 18-carat gold. It also features an 8-megapixel high definition camera plus a headset, the Nokia J, which is a unique wireless headset with superior sound quality. It comes pre-loaded with a specially-customized Symbian Anna operating system, giving a theme that blends with the color of the handset. The phone will be made available only in select markets.
Nokia C100 is a basic cellular phone featuring FM radio, flashlight, calendar, alarm clock and a grid-based menu system.
Nokia C603 is a Symbian Belle device for the lower end of the market. The OS has up to six home screens and a range of widgets that can be placed in any combination the user chooses. The browser is four times faster than that found on previous Symbian versions, and offers enhanced compatibility with modern Web standards.
Nokia C700 is the smallest smartphone at the time of its launch. It carries a 3.2" AMOLED display, NFC capabilities, and the first device to use the Symbian Belle operating system update. Home screens are designed to be more personalized, often compared to Android's user interface.
Nokia C701 offers a high-resolution display using Nokia's proprietary ClearBlack technology with IPS LCD. It is one of the first three devices to carry the Symbian Belle operating system, and is armed with a 1 GHz processor. The phone supports embedded NFC, customizable widgets, informative lock screen and is similar to Nokia C7 in appearance.
Nokia C1000 is a Chinese-specific mobile phone, for the lower part of the market and includes Ovi Life Tools. It runs on Series 30, and can play music through its MP3 player.
Nokia C1010 is a China-only mobile phone, offering dual-SIM ability and Easy Swap. It is made for emerging cities and provinces, where mobile phones are usually shared within a family or community. It offers MP3 player, Pinyin compatibility and Ovi Life Tools. It runs on the Series 30 operating system.

List of Zseries devices 

Nokia Zseries (stands for Zuper) is supposed to be Nokia's MeeGo tablet series. Originally intended to be released in 2010 and early 2011, the tablets were cancelled for unknown reasons. Only a product name has been revealed from the Ovi Store in November 2010.

The list may also include upcoming devices or others that are previously intended to be a part of the series, but was scrapped or renamed due to Nokia's number-only naming change. These are the tablets included in the series:
Nokia Z500 is the sole representative of the series, at least as leaked, and was shown on the Ovi Store in November 2010. It was removed a few days later, leading speculations that the tablet will be postponed. The tablet runs on a native version of the MeeGo operating system, and is packed with an ARM chip. On a Disney film called Tron: Legacy, the tablet was shown being used during a meeting in ENCOM Inc., by one of the movie's characters. However, Eldar Murtazin tweeted that the tablet was to be cancelled due to the falling off of agreements between the carrier's pricing of the device, particularly AT&T. Several demo videos appeared on video-sharing site YouTube, containing details on how the device works and how to use it. Only one picture of the device has been known to exist as of the moment, and was captured inside Nokia's mobile development office by an unknown employee. Patent applications for the said device have been gathered from the FCC files in March 2011, and since then, nothing was heard from Nokia Z500 anymore.

List of Tseries devices 

Nokia Tseries (stands for Time) is a China-specific line of phones, made to cater services offered in China where most technologies and Web features are disabled or replaced by the country's proprietary inventions. For instance, most of the phones offered in this series would include the TD-SCDMA and EV-DO networks which are dominant in that marketplace. The line was launched on 13 June 2011 in the Chinese version of the Nokia Conversations blog.

The list may also include upcoming devices. These are the phones included in the series:
Nokia T7 is the first smartphone offered in the Tseries line, featuring a Nokia N8 shell with less specifications. Instead of a 12-megapixel shooter, the camera was modified to only 8 megapixels, but still offers high quality picture-taking and HD video recording. It is notable that the HDMI is now gone, and the network that the phone supports are TD-SCDMA and GSM.
Nokia T702 is a China-only handset, similar to the design of the Nokia E6 but with larger keys and apps suitable for the country. It also has deep integration of Chinese characters and special networking sites intended for that region. It is available to China Mobile only and will be offered in a modified Symbian Anna operating system.

List of Aseries devices 

The Nokia Aseries (stands for Asha, which means hope), is a feature-phone line introduced by Nokia during Nokia World 2011. The phones in the series are for developing markets, and more for younger users, for messaging and connectivity.

The list may also include upcoming devices. These are the phones included in the series:
Nokia A200 is a QWERTY featurephone, with dual-SIM capability and Easy Swap, enabling the user to change SIM cards without having to turn off the device. SIM manager has also been added in order to manage different profiles for different SIM cards inserted on the phone.
Nokia A201 is a single SIM version of the aforementioned device. It is for music fans, with listening time of up to 7 hours and storage capacity of 32 GB.
Nokia A300 is Nokia's Series 40 offering that combines a keypad and a touchscreen. The phone has 1 GHz processor, 3G connectivity and preloaded with Angry Birds, the first time the game has been offered on non-smartphones.
Nokia A303 is a phone with QWERTY keypad input and a touchscreen. Armed with 1 GHz processor, upgraded Nokia Browser, 2.6-inch touchscreen, and Nokia Store. Apps are readily available for download. The phone is said to break the line between featurephones and smartphones.
Nokia A2000 is a China-specific featurephone with a QWERTY keypad. It supports storage of up to 32 GB through the use of microSD cards.
Nokia A2010 is a Chinese-only phone modeled after Nokia Asha 201 (or A201) featuring a QWERTY keypad and Asian language support.
Nokia A3000 is a touchscreen and keypad phone, for China only. It is modeled after the Nokia Asha 300 (or A300). The only difference found is the inclusion of Chinese language support.
Nokia A3030 is a touchscreen and QWERTY keypad phone, for Chinese countries. It is modeled after Nokia Asha 303 (or A303). Aside from the Chinese language support, it also has compatibility with Angry Birds, a 1 GHz processor and dedicated music buttons.

List of Lseries devices 

The Nokia Lseries (stands for Lumia, which means light) is a series of smartphones, originally made by Nokia and using the Windows Phone operating system, and officially unveiled at Nokia World 2011. This was created through an exclusive partnership in February of that year, that will allow Nokia to use and modify Microsoft's mobile operating system. These devices come with a host of Nokia-exclusive services.

Microsoft purchased Nokia's Devices and Services division in April 2014, and since then the Lumia series has been manufactured exclusively by Microsoft's subsidiary Microsoft Mobile, initially retaining Nokia branding but later dropped in favor of that of Microsoft.

The first generation of phones in the series include the Nokia Lumia 510, Nokia Lumia 610, Nokia Lumia 710, Nokia Lumia 800, and Nokia Lumia 900, all of which run Windows Phone 7. Subsequent generations use Windows Phone 8 or Windows Phone 8.1. A full list of devices can be found at Microsoft Lumia#List of Lumia devices.

See also
 List of Nokia products

References 

Symbian OS

sv:Lista över Nokia-smartphones#Nserien